The Vital Spark is a BBC Scotland television series set in the western isles of Scotland in the 1930s, based on the Para Handy books by Neil Munro. It starred Roddy McMillan as Peter "Para Handy" MacFarlane, captain of the puffer Vital Spark. 

The series followed the Vital Spark's adventures around the coastal waters of west Scotland and the various schemes that Para Handy would get himself and his crew involved in.

The comedy was first broadcast in August 1965 as an episode of the BBC’s Comedy Playhouse series. Following this two series, of six and seven episodes respectively, were commissioned by BBC Scotland and transmitted in early 1966, and autumn 1967. Both series were made in black-and-white. Of these only "A Drop O’ The Real Stuff" survives. In March 1973 an hour-long TV Special was made, in colour, featuring the same cast. After the success of this, a further six episodes (essentially remakes of previous scripts but in a more contemporary setting) were commissioned, broadcast in autumn 1974. Four of the seven colour episodes survive complete.

Cast 
Roddy McMillan - Captain Peter "Para Handy" MacFarlane
John Grieve - Dan Macphail, the engineer
Walter Carr - Dougie Campbell, the mate
Alex McAvoy - Davie "Sunny Jim" Green
Robert Urquhart - Dougie (pilot only)

Episodes

Series 1

Series 2

Series 3

References

Genome, Radio Times listings.

External links
    

  
1965 Scottish television series debuts
1974 Scottish television series endings
Scottish television sitcoms
BBC television comedy
1960s Scottish television series
1970s Scottish television series
Lost BBC episodes
Television shows set in Scotland
1960s British comedy television series
1970s British comedy television series